The Man in the Glass Booth is a 1975 American drama film directed by Arthur Hiller. The film was produced and released as part of the American Film Theatre, which adapted theatrical works for a subscription cinema series. The screenplay was adapted from Robert Shaw's 1967 novel and 1968 stage play, both of the same name. The novel was the second in a trilogy of novels, preceded by The Flag (1965), and followed by A Card from Morocco (1969).

The plot was inspired by the kidnapping and trial of the German Nazi SS-Obersturmbannführer (lieutenant colonel) Adolf Eichmann, who was one of the major organizers of the Holocaust.

Plot 
Arthur Goldman is Jewish and a Nazi death camp survivor. Now a rich industrialist, he lives in luxury in a Manhattan high-rise. He banters with his assistant Charlie, often shocking him with his outrageousness and irreverence about aspects of Jewish life. One day, Israeli Mossad agents kidnap Goldman and take him to Israel for trial on charges of being a Nazi war criminal. Goldman's trial forces his accusers to face not only his presumed guilt, but theirs as well.

At the end, it appears that Goldman is not a Nazi or a war criminal after all; he falsified the dental records which the Israelis used to identify him to bring about the trial. When the deception is revealed by the Israeli prosecutor, Goldman is left standing in the trial court's bulletproof glass box, a broken man. The stress shatters his mental health and he becomes catatonic. He then relives in his mind a Nazi firing squad execution and dies as those in the courtroom whisper the Jewish prayer, "Sh'ma Yis'ra'eil Adonai Eloheinu Adonai echad" ("Hear, O Israel: The LORD is our God, the LORD is one").

Cast

Development

While The Man in the Glass Booth was being developed for the screen, Shaw disapproved of the screenplay and had his name removed from the credits. Shaw viewed the completed film before its release and asked to have his name reinstated. In 2002, director Arthur Hiller related Shaw's objection to the screenplay and his change of heart,

When we decided that we needed more emotions in the film and leaned it towards that, we tried, obviously, to be honest to Robert Shaw, to keep that intellectual game-playing, but to create more of an emotional environment. And Robert Shaw became very disturbed. He did not like the idea and indeed, if you will watch the film, you will see that his name does not appear in the credits, nor does it even say, "based on the play, The Man in the Glass Booth" because he wouldn't let us do it. He just didn't like the idea until he saw the film. Then he phoned Eddie Anhalt, the screenwriter, and congratulated him because he thought it was—just kept the tone he wanted and did it so well. And he phoned Mort Abrahams the Executive Producer to see if he could get his name put on the final credits. But it was too late to restore his name, all the prints were all made.

Production 
The film was shot for $1 million, with 10 days of rehearsals and 23 days of filming in the summer of 1974. The exteriors of Goldman's penthouse were filmed atop the Crown Building in New York City, where the roof of the building was dressed to look like a balcony and garden. Interiors were filmed at the 20th Century Fox Studios in Century City, California.

Awards and honors 
Maximilian Schell was nominated for the Academy Award for Best Actor and the Golden Globe Award for Best Actor – Motion Picture Drama for his performance. Edward Anhalt was nominated for the Writers Guild of America Award for Best Drama Adapted from Another Medium for his screenplay.

Reception 
Roger Ebert wrote "Arthur Hiller's film for the AFT is a very good one, although it suffers from one basic problem. By its very nature, film tends to be a realistic medium, photographing the outsides of real world. Robert Shaw's play, even as adapted and made somewhat more realistic by Edward Anhalt, is nevertheless a symbolic and mannered one". Raymond Benson wrote in 2009, "The film is a riveting, first-rate drama featuring an Oscar-nominated, tour-de-force performance by Schell".

Home video
The film was released as a region 1 DVD in 2003 and again in 2008. A Blu-ray version was released in the US in 2017.

See also
 List of American films of 1975
 List of Holocaust films
 "Duet", an episode of Star Trek: Deep Space Nine based on this film

References

External links 
 
 

1975 drama films
1975 films
American drama films
Films based on British novels
American films based on plays
Films about the aftermath of the Holocaust
World War II war crimes trials films
Films directed by Arthur Hiller
Films produced by Ely Landau
Films set in Israel
Films set in Manhattan
Films based on adaptations
Films with screenplays by Edward Anhalt
1970s English-language films
1970s American films